Timothy B. Howard was the Sheriff of Erie County, New York.  He was Sheriff from 2005 to 2022, succeeding Patrick Gallivan, who was elected to the New York State Senate. Howard currently serves as the Town Supervisor of Wales, New York, taking office in January of 2022.

Political career

2013
Howard faced three candidates during the 2013 election.  Howard himself received the Erie County Republican Party nomination and the Erie County Conservative Party nomination.  Meanwhile, the two other candidates Richard "Dick" Dobson, Sr. and Bert Dunn both went to a Democratic Primary.  Dobson came out as the primary's winner, becoming the Democratic nominee while Dunn stayed in the race by starting a political party to receive ballot access; the Erie County Law and Order Party.

2017
In 2017, Howard was reelected, narrowly defeating Democratic challenger Bernie Tolbert.

2019
In 2019, Howard stated that the use of body cameras was against Christian principles, and that anyone who did not trust an officer at his word was equal to Thomas doubting Christ.

Personal life
Sheriff Howard lives in South Wales, New York with his wife, Susan.

He comes from a family of law enforcement officials, ranging from municipal judges to state troopers.  He has two children and six grandchildren.

Controversy
On February 8, 2019, 7:45am EST, NBC News journalist Erin Donaghue published report that Sheriff Tim Howard's administration was involved in mentally ill inmate's avoidable death at New York's Erie County Holding Center.  Sources say 73 sheriff deputies "literally watched" inmate India Cummings die of serious bodily injuries that were otherwise treatable.  Erie County Holding Center is shown to be "most problematic facilities in the state," according to a 2018 Commission of Correction report.

References

Year of birth missing (living people)
Living people
Sheriffs of Erie County, New York
New York (state) Republicans